Beris cypria is a European species of soldier fly.

Distribtion
Cyprus

References

Stratiomyidae
Diptera of Europe
Endemic fauna of Cyprus
Insects described in 1970